Shift in the Wind is an album by American jazz bassist Gary Peacock, with pianist Art Lande and drummer Eliot Zigmund, recorded in 1980 and released on the ECM label.

Reception
The Allmusic review by Scott Yanow awarded the album 4 stars stating "The interplay between these masterful musicians is more significant than the actual compositions and rewards repeats listenings".

Track listing
All compositions by Gary Peacock except as indicated
 "So Green" (Art Lande) - 6:15 
 "Fractions" (Art Lande, Gary Peacock, Eliot Zigmund) - 5:03 
 "Last First" - 8:15 
 "Shift in the Wind" - 5:51 
 "Centers" (Lande, Peacock, Zigmund) - 6:56 
 "Caverns Beneath the Zoth" (Lande) - 10:01 
 "Valentine" - 5:10
Recorded at Columbia Recording Studios in New York City in February 1980.

Personnel
 Gary Peacock — bass
 Art Lande — piano
 Eliot Zigmund — drums

References

ECM Records albums
Gary Peacock albums
1980 albums
Albums produced by Manfred Eicher